Rahul Sharma is an Indian television actor. He is best known for his roles in the anthology series Teri Meri Love Stories and the soap operas Kaal Bhairav Rahasya, Ek Ghar Banaunga and Mitegi Laxman Rekha .

Early life
Rahul hails from Dausa in Rajasthan and moved to Mumbai to become an actor. Sharma is a science graduate who wanted to do MBA but after attending a 50-day theatre workshop at the National School of Drama in New Delhi his life changed and he decided to be an actor. He has described himself as an avid traveller.

Career
In 2012, he played the male lead in an episode of Teri Meri Love Stories. He played the role of Aakash Garg in the Star Plus TV series Ek Ghar Banaunga, Raghav Roy in Sony Pal's Ek Rishta Aisa Bhi and Vishesh in &TV's Mitegi Laxman Rekha opposite Shivani Tomar in 2018.

Filmography

Web series

Music videos

Short films

Personal life
The actor married Neha, a school teacher on January 22, 2022 in Rajasthan. It was an arranged marriage.

References

External links 

 Living people
 People from Dausa district
 21st-century Indian male actors
 Indian male television actors
 Male actors in Hindi television
 Indian television presenters
 Male actors from Rajasthan
 Year of birth missing (living people)